Domingo Benegas Jiménez (born 4 August 1946 in Capiatá, Paraguay) is a former Paraguayan footballer.

He played for Atlético de Madrid between 1972 and 1977, winning the Spanish League in 1973 and 1977, the Spanish Cup in 1976, and the Intercontinental Cup in 1975. He played in the 1974 European Cup Final, which Atlético .

Honours
Atlético Madrid
Liga: 1973, 1977
Copa del Generalísimo: 1975-76
Intercontinental Cup: 1974

References

External links
 

1946 births
Spanish footballers
Atlético Madrid footballers
Living people
Association football midfielders